The Grand Valley AVA is an American Viticultural Area located in Mesa County, Colorado, primarily in Grand Junction and Palisade.  It is located roughly 200 miles West-Southwest of Denver.  The high-desert AVA - with an average elevation of between 4,000 and 5,000 feet above sea level - is defined by the irrigated agricultural area served via canals within the Grand Valley of the Colorado River. The AVA was established in 1991 as the first of two Colorado wine regions. The West Elks AVA is the second federally designated AVA in Colorado.

The AVA encompasses  and contains some of the highest vineyards in the world. The terrain is varied, ranging from alluvial soils along the Colorado River to stony and loamy soils on mesas.  Climate is high desert, subject to swings of temperature and wide diurnal variation. The AVA enjoys the most temperate climate within the state of Colorado, with the USDA cold hardiness zone ranging from 6 to 7. The eastern part of the AVA near the town of Palisade has consistent breezes that provide good air drainage, reducing the risk of frost.  During a typical growing season, the valley is hot, dry and sunny during the day while far cooler at night due to the arid environment.  This makes for ideal fruit-growing conditions.

Colorado's Grand Valley - particularly the eastern stretch - is unofficially considered 'Colorado Wine Country' and is quickly becoming a popular and sought after destination for Enotourism because of both the growing interest in wine tourism and the abundance of natural recreational activities and scenery surrounding the area including Colorado National Monument and the Book Cliffs. There are around two dozen wineries/vineyards in addition to an abundance of cideries, meaderies, and orchards. Viticulture began in the area in the late 19th century. State Governor George A. Crawford planted a  vineyard in the Grand Valley in 1890. To this day, most of Colorado's grape production is from the Grand Valley AVA. However, the continental climate somewhat limits the varieties used in grape production and not all varieties produce substantial yields. Grape varieties planted within the AVA vary widely and average yields are relatively low at about 2.5 tons/acre. Wine styles range from dry white and red wines to semi-sweet and dessert wines; and even ice wine. Due to the abundance of orchards in the area many growers will incorporate other local fruits - such as peaches, plums and cherries - into their sweeter wines. However, traditional Merlot & Riesling are two of the most popular and easily grown and known grapes in Grand Valley.

In 2018, Wine Enthusiast Magazine named Colorado's Grand Valley AVA one of the 'Top Ten Wine Travel Destinations in the World'.  In September 2019, Palisade hosted its 28th annual Colorado Mountain Winefest which was named the 'Best Wine Fest in the Nation' by USA Today. Over 6,000 attended the sold-out event which showed off several hundred local wines, meads & ciders from several dozen Colorado wineries, meaderies and cideries.

References

External links
 Colorado Wine
  TTB AVA Map

American Viticultural Areas
Colorado River
Colorado wine
Geography of Mesa County, Colorado
1991 establishments in Colorado